Mariinsky Theatre is a documentary film made for The South Bank Show, written and directed by Margy Kinmonth and produced by Foxtrot Films Ltd with The Valery Gergiev Foundation in association with ITV Productions and Granada International.

It celebrates the 225th anniversary of Saint Petersburg's Mariinsky Theatre, and features Valery Gergiev, Plácido Domingo, Anna Netrebko, Dmitri Hvorostovsky, Maxim Shostakovich, Maya Plisetskaya and Rodion Shchedrin.

Credits 
 Contributors
 Valery Gergiev
 Placido Domingo
 Mikhail Piotrovsky
 Rodion Shchedrin
 Anna Netrebko
 Maya Plisetskaya
 Altnay Asylmuratova
 Ulyana Lopatkina
 Yuri Temirkanov
 Maxim Shostakovich
 Dmitri Hvorostovsky

Screenings 
28th Festival International Du Films Sur L’Art, Montreal, March 2010.

References 

2008 films
2000s English-language films